"Worry About It Later" is the second single to be taken from The Futureheads second album News and Tributes. It performed poorly in the charts only reaching a chart position of #52 in the UK Singles Chart.

This was the last single released from the album because of the band's parting from record label 679.

Track listing
CD
 "Worry About It Later"
 "Skip to the End (Live At The Sage With "Field Music")"

7" #1
 "Worry About It Later"
 "Fallout (Switch Remix)"

7" #2
 "Worry About It Later"
 "Worry About It Later (Live At The Sage With "Field Music")"

The Futureheads songs
2006 singles
2006 songs
679 Artists singles
Songs written by Ross Millard